Ontochariesthes namibianus is a species of beetle in the family Cerambycidae. It was described by Adlbauer in 1996. It is known from Namibia.

References

Endemic fauna of Namibia
Tragocephalini
Beetles described in 1996